Dakshin: South Indian Myths and Fables Retold is a collection of 15 folktales from South India. It was authored by Nitin Kushalappa M P, illustrated by Pari Satarkar (artwork) and Isha Nagar (cover),  and published by Puffin India (a subdivision of Penguin Random House) in 2023.

Stories 

 The Tale of the Mynah who never gave up
 The Tale of Bala Nagamma and the Evil Sorceror
 The Giant Red Kangaroo, the Queen and the Hunter
 The Tale of the Singing Drum
 The Blessings of Vishnu
 The Cat and the Fly's Delicious Congee
 The Cow and the Tiger
 The Seven Fairy Princesses
 The Tale of the Last Sun
 The Tale of the Miser
 The Tale of the Jungle River
 The Tale of the Boy Champion
 The Tale of the Good Boy
 The Moon Prince
 The Sage and the River

About the author

Sammohinee Ghosh of the Mid-day, a Mumbai daily, says that "Kushalappa’s writing strikes the reader through its detailed and in-depth research". Born Mookonda Poonacha Nitin Kushalappa, Nitin hails from Coorg, a region rich in oral lore. He is the researcher for the Kodava Virtual Museum. He has done work on an old temple script. His various articles have been published by the Deccan Herald, Star of Mysore and Coffeeland News. He has authored published books. He writes under the names Mookonda Kushalappa and Nitin Kushalappa.

References

Year of work missing
Indian books
Indian folklore